Jim Atchison is an American business executive. He was the President and Chief Executive Officer of SeaWorld Parks & Entertainment, positions he had held since 2009. On December 11, 2014 he resigned. SeaWorld acknowledged in August 2014 that the film Blackfish had hurt revenues at its San Diego, California park. At the time of Atchison's resignation the company's share price had fallen 44% that year.

He previously served as President and Chief Operating Officer of Busch Entertainment Corporation from 2007 to 2009, and as Executive Vice President and General Manager of SeaWorld Orlando from 2003 to 2007.

Atchison is a past member of the University of Central Florida Board of Trustees. He graduated from the University of South Florida with a Bachelor's in Business Administration, and from UCF with a Master's of Business Administration (MBA) in 1992.

References

Living people
University of South Florida alumni
University of Central Florida alumni
University of Central Florida Trustees
American chief operating officers
Year of birth missing (living people)